The Argentine presidential election of 1880 was held on 11 April to choose the president of Argentina. Julio Argentino Roca was elected president.

Background

A leader of the Conquest of the Desert, as well as of the suppression of Mitre's 1874 uprising and others, President Avellaneda had decided on General Julio Roca as his successor, early on. Memories of Mitre's defeat did not sit well with Buenos Aires separatists, and this faction nominated the Governor of Buenos Aires Province, Carlos Tejedor. Roca's 11 April 1880, selection by the electoral college was followed by Tejedor's armed insurrection, and though the latter was defeated, Mitre brokered negotiations between Tejedor's separatists and the national government. These negotiations eventually result in the Federalization of Buenos Aires in September, stabilizing the powerful province's position within Argentina.

Results

Notes

References

 
 
 
 

1880 elections in South America
1880 in Argentina
1880
Elections in Argentina